Sankoh is a surname originating from West Africa and can refer to:

 Abu Sankoh, Sierra Leonean football manager
 Alfred Sankoh (born 1988), Sierra Leonean footballer
 Bai Kelfa Sankoh, Sierra Leonean politician
 Baïssama Sankoh (born 1992), Guinean footballer
 Foday Sankoh (1937–2003), Sierra Leonean rebel leader
 Gibril Sankoh (born 1983), Sierra Leonean footballer
 Lamina Sankoh (1884–1964), Sierra Leonean politician

See also
Sanko (surname)

Surnames of African origin